Devic may refer to:

 Eugène Devic (1858–1930), French neurologist
 Émilien Devic (1888-1944), French footballer
 Devic kingdom, the realm of devas, non-physical beings described in certain doctrines, religions and popular culture
 Devics, a band from Los Angeles, United States
 Devič, a Serb Orthodox abbey in Kosovo
 Neuromyelitis optica, Devic's disease or Devic's syndrome

See also
 Dević, a surname